A ubiquinol is an electron-rich (reduced) form of coenzyme Q (ubiquinone). The term most often refers to ubiquinol-10, with a 10-unit tail most commonly found in humans.

The natural ubiquinol form of coenzyme Q is 2,3-dimethoxy-5-methyl-6-poly prenyl-1,4-benzoquinol, where the polyprenylated side-chain is 9-10 units long in mammals. Coenzyme Q10 (CoQ10) exists in three redox states, fully oxidized (ubiquinone), partially reduced (semiquinone or ubisemiquinone), and fully reduced (ubiquinol). The redox functions of ubiquinol in cellular energy production and antioxidant protection are based on the ability to exchange two electrons in a redox cycle between ubiquinol (reduced) and the ubiquinone (oxidized) form.

Characteristics

Because humans can synthesize ubiquinol, it is not classed as a vitamin.

Bioavailability
It is well-established that CoQ10 is not well absorbed into the body, as has been published in many peer-reviewed scientific journals. Since the ubiquinol form has two additional hydrogens, it results in the conversion of two ketone groups into hydroxyl groups on the active portion of the molecule. This causes an increase in the polarity of the CoQ10 molecule and may be a significant factor behind the observed enhanced bioavailability of ubiquinol.

Content in foods
Varying amounts of ubiquinol are found in different types of food. An analysis of a range of foods found ubiquinol to be present in 66 out of 70 items and accounted for 46% of the total coenzyme Q10 intake in the Japanese diet. The following chart is a sample of the results.

Molecular aspects
Ubiquinol is a benzoquinol and is the reduced product of ubiquinone also called coenzyme Q10. Its tail consists of 10 isoprene units.

The reduction of ubiquinone to ubiquinol occurs in Complexes I & II in the electron transfer chain. The Q cycle is a process that occurs in cytochrome b, a component of Complex III in the electron transport chain, and that converts ubiquinol to ubiquinone in a cyclic fashion. When ubiquinol binds to cytochrome b, the pKa of the phenolic group decreases so that the proton ionizes and the phenoxide anion is formed.

If the phenoxide oxygen is oxidized, the semiquinone is formed with the unpaired electron being located on the ring.

References

Nutrition
Orphan drugs